Adolph Gregory Schmitt, C.M.M.  (20 April 1905 – 5 December 1976) was German prelate of the Roman Catholic Church. He was killed by a black nationalist guerrilla during the Rhodesian Bush War in 1976.

Biography
Adolph Schmitt was born in Rimpar, Germany, ordained a priest on 19 March 1931 from the religious order of the Congregation of Mariannhill Missionaries. On 23 December 1950 Schmitt was appointed Vicar Apostolic of the then Vicariate Apostolic of Bulawayo and ordained on 2 April 1951. He retired on 9 May 1974.

Death
During the Rhodesian Bush War, on 5 December 1976, Schmitt and two of his companions, a nun and a priest, were shot by a black nationalist guerrilla on the way to a hospital visit. The sole survivor of the attack, the nun, said that their car was stopped and the guerrilla demanded money but then opened fire with a machine gun.

See also
Archdiocese of Bulawayo
Johanna Decker

External links
Catholic-Hierarchy
 Bulawayo Diocese

References 

1905 births
1976 deaths
1976 murders in Africa
20th-century German Roman Catholic bishops
20th-century Roman Catholic bishops in Zimbabwe
Deaths by firearm in Rhodesia
German people murdered abroad
German Roman Catholic missionaries
People from Bulawayo
People from the Kingdom of Bavaria
People from Würzburg (district)
People murdered in Rhodesia
Rhodesian murder victims
Rhodesian Roman Catholic bishops
Roman Catholic bishops of Bulawayo
White Rhodesian people